Maren Morris Live from Chicago is an extended play (EP) by American country artist Maren Morris. It was released on May 8, 2020 via Sony Music Nashville and included four tracks. It was the third extended play issued in Morris's career and was her first to be recorded live. The project was recorded at the Riviera Theatre in Chicago, Illinois at the launch of Morris's 2019 world tour. It was released exclusively through Amazon Music.

Background, content and release
Maren Morris first garnered commercial success with the 2016 single "My Church", which became a top ten country song. In the singles and albums that followed, Morris mixed country music with pop, R&B and rock that helped bring crossover success to her career. In 2019, her fourth studio album was released titled Girl and was followed by a corresponding world tour. The material included on Maren Morris Live from Chicago was taken from the opening night of her world tour. The album's tracks were recorded at the Riviera Theatre in Chicago, Illinois in March 2019. The project was chosen to be released as an alternative to her concerts being cancelled due to the COVID-19 pandemic. "Feeling so nostalgic for shows lately so here’s a few tracks from opening night of GIRL: The World Tour," Morris wrote in a statement.

A total of four tracks (all recorded live) comprised the extended play. It included the title track from 2019's Girl and the crossover pop single "The Bones". It also featured two additional tracks that were first included on Girl: "Common" and "A Song for Everything". When Morris opened her world tour in 2019 at the Riviera Theatre, the tracks were live streamed through Amazon. The extended play version was issued exclusively through Amazon Music on May 8, 2020.

Track listing

Release history

References

2020 EPs
Maren Morris EPs
Sony Music EPs